In 2010, the Campeonato Brasileiro Série C, the third level of the Brazilian League, was contested by 20 clubs divided in four groups, followed by a playoff round, from July 18 to November 21, 2010. The top four clubs, the ones which qualified to the semifinals, were promoted to the Campeonato Brasileiro Série B to be contested in 2011. Meanwhile, the bottom four clubs, the ones that finished in last place of each group, were relegated to 2011 Série D.

Team information

Format
 First Stage: The 20 teams are divided in four groups of 5, playing within them in a double round-robin format. The two best ranked in each group advance towards next stage. The last placed team in each group is relegated to Série D 2011
 Quarterfinals: Eight qualified teams play in two-leg format, home and away. Winners qualify to semifinals and are promoted to Série B 2011.
 Semifinals: Quarterfinals winners play in two-leg format, home and away. Winners qualify to the Finals.
 Finals: Semifinals winners play in two-leg format, home and away. Winners are declared champions.

Results

First stage

Group A (AC-CE-PA)

Group B (AL-PB-PE-RN)

Group C (DF-MT-MG-RJ-SP)

Group D (RS-SC)

Knockout stages

(p) won on penalty shootout.
(a) won by away goals rule.

Quarterfinals
Paysandu vs. Salgueiro first leg played on October 9; Second leg played on October 17.ABC vs. Águia de Marabá first leg played on October 16; Second leg played on October 24.Ituiutaba vs. Chapecoense first leg played on October 9; Second leg played on October 16.Criciúma vs. Macaé first leg played on October 10; Second leg played on October 23.

Team #1 played second match at home.

Semifinals
First leg played on October 30. Second leg played on November 6 and 07

Team #1 played second match at home.

Finals
All times Brazilian Daylight Saving Time

ABC won 1–0 on aggregate.

Aggregate table

Top goalscorers

References

Campeonato Brasileiro Série C seasons
3